Can't Let You Go Even If I Die is the debut extended play by South Korean boy band 2AM. The title track "Can't Let You Go Even If I Die" was released as a single. It was the most downloaded song of 2010 in South Korea, with 3,352,827 downloads.

A repackaged 11-track version renamed I Was Wrong was released as the group's first studio album. It contained all six tracks of the mini album Can't Let You Go Even If I Die with five additional tracks not found on the original mini-album. The title track "I Was Wrong" was released on March 16, 2010, as a single.

History
As opposed to their previous songs, the tracks on the mini-album were not written by Park Jin-young, but by Big Hit Entertainment founder and Park's long-time songwriting partner Bang Si-hyuk, who is famous for composing Baek Ji-young's "총 맞은 것처럼" ("Like Being Hit By a Bullet") and 8Eight's "심장이 없어" ("Without a Heart").
Although set to be released on January 26, 2010, the mini-album was unexpectedly delayed and instead released 2 days later.<ref>2AM이 새 앨범의 발매를 연기하기로 결정했다. . SPORTS SEOUL. January 25, 2010.</ref>

Music video
In the week before the song's official release, four teaser videos of each member were released on 2AM's official YouTube channel, each depicting a different season. The only full music video was released on February 20, 2010.

Promotion
The song quickly topped the online music charts after its release, beating Girls' Generation's "Oh!" and CNBLUE's "I'm A Loner".
2AM made their comeback stage on "Inkigayo" on January 24, 2010.

On February 7, 2010, 2AM won their first Mutizen award on "Inkigayo" since their debut. On February 25, 2010, their second win was on Mnet M!Countdown. They won a second Mutizen on their final day of promotions on March 7, 2010.

Accolades

Track listing

On the re-release album I Was Wrong, all tracks from "Can't Let You Go Even If I Die" were listed as tracks 7 to 11, only "Prologue" stayed as the track 1.

Charts

Album chartCan't Let You Go Even If I DieI Was Wrong''

Single chart

See also
 List of best-selling singles in South Korea

References

External links 
 Official Website

2010 EPs
2AM (band) albums
JYP Entertainment EPs
Korean-language EPs
Hybe Corporation EPs